Frankston Blues is a NBL1 South club based in Melbourne. The club fields a team in both the Men's and Women's NBL1 South. The club is a division of Frankston & District Basketball Association (FDBA), the major administrative basketball organisation in City of Frankston. The Blues play their home games at Frankston Basketball Stadium.

Club history

Background
The FDBA's origins can be traced back to 1959, when a group of students from the Frankston Teachers' College travelled to Albert Park for a tournament where they met other players from Frankston. Through these contacts made, a few games were organised to cater for the need in the Frankston area. The earliest games were played at the Balcombe Army Barracks. The Army and Navy had teams involved, but no formal competition existed. It is thought that the first President of the FDBA was an NCO from the Army who happened to be on an inservice at the time.

In 1960, the College built a gymnasium. Teams from the YMCA and Seaford joined in and most of the administration was done by the teams on a rotational basis, such as collecting fees and marking lines. The President of the College, George Jenkins, was happy for the students to be involved in such activity as long as there was a formal structure, and financial accountability was in place. A staff team joined in the early 1960s and helped in negotiations with other groups, who were constantly in competition for use of the Gymnasium on the Campus. This staff team remained a vital part of the competition until the early 1970s.

In the early 1970s, the Police and Citizens Club built the existing facility at the Towerhill Road site. This, along with Ballam Park Technical School, was the site of the FDBA until one of many approaches over the years to Frankston City Council was successful, and the two-court stadium at Bardia Avenue was built and opened on 9 March 1979.

Early years of the Bears
At the time that ground was broken for the stadium, moves were also made to bring a senior representative team to Frankston. Jason Placas negotiated to bring Tony Gaze from Dandenong, along with the nucleus of his team. Four of these players were Frankston Junior players. The team competed in the VBA Championships in 1979 and 1980, and joined the South Eastern Basketball League (SEBL) in 1981. After winning the SEBL in 1982, the Frankston Bears joined the NBL in 1983 and competed at that level for two years, before financial pressures became too much for the Association to handle.

Championship success
In 1986, Frankston joined forces with neighbouring Chelsea Association to form the Bayside Blues Basketball Club. This Club represented both Associations from 1986 to 1995, when Chelsea opted out because of financial commitments. During this time, in 1990, a women's SEABL competition was established, with a Bayside Blues team being one of the inaugural teams.

After finishing runners-up in 1991 and 1992 as Bayside, the Frankston Blues women won the championship in 1993. They went on to finish as runners-up un 1994 before winning again in 1997.

The men on the other hand were conference champions as Bayside in both 1992 and 1993 before they too changed their name to Frankston and won another conference championship in 1995. They also won conference championships in 1998 and 2000, and were National Runners-up in 1995 and 1998. The women's team went on to win the SEABL championship in 2004, while the men's team won the South Conference title in 2009.

In 2019, following the demise of the SEABL, the Blues joined the NBL1 South.

NBL Season by season

References

External links
FDBA's official website

Defunct National Basketball League (Australia) teams
South East Australian Basketball League teams
Basketball teams established in 1981
Basketball teams in Melbourne
1981 establishments in Australia
Frankston, Victoria
Sport in the City of Frankston